Señorita Panamá 1990 the 8th Señorita Panamá pageant and 25th celebration of the Miss Panamá contest (1987 mark the 24th and last edition), also this year marked the debut of the Miss Universe License in the hands of RPC Channel 4, and unify the event which created the slogan "Three Crowns for Three Beauties".  Señorita Panamá used to send the winner to Miss World, but starting in 1990 the winners would go to Miss Universe, Miss World and Miss Hispanidad respectively.  It was also the first edition held after the Panama Invasion, when the economic and political situation in the country had a positive shift.  

The political turmoil in Panama caused an absence of three years in the Miss Universe pageant from 1988 to 1990.  No Panamanian queens participated during these years.

The event was held in Teatro Anayansi Centro de Convenciones Atlapa, Panama city, Panama, on August, 1990. After weeks of events. The winner of the pageant was Liz Michelle De León.

The pageant was broadcast on RPC-TVPanamá Channel 4. About 15 contestants from all over Panamá competed for the prestigious crown. At the conclusion of the final night of competition, outgoing titleholder Gabriela Deleuze Ducasa Miss Panamá 1987 of Los Santos crowned Liz Michelle De León of Panama Centro  as the new Señorita Panamá for Miss Universe.

In the same night was celebrated the election of the "Señorita Panamá World",  was announced the winner of the Señorita Panamá Mundo title. Señorita Panamá 1989 Gloria Stella Quintana of Panama Centro crowned Madelaine Leignadier Dawson of Panama Centro as the new Señorita Panamá World. Also was selected the representative for the Miss Hispanidad pageant Ana Lucía Herrera of Panama Centro was crowned as Señorita Panamá-Miss Hispanidad 1990.

De León Paz competed in the 40th Miss Universe pageant, was held on May 17, 1991 at the Aladdin Theatre for the Performing Arts in Las Vegas, Nevada, USA. 

In other hands Leignadier Dawson competed in Miss World 1990,  the 40th edition of the Miss World pageant, was held on 8 November 1990 at the London Palladium in London, UK. Herrera competed in Miss Hispanidad International 1990 pageant, the 3rd edition of Miss Hispanidad Pageant and was held on August 25, 1009 in Miami Beach, United States.

Final result

Contestants 
These are the competitors who have been selected this year.

References

External links
Señorita Panamá official website
Miss Panamá

Señorita Panamá
1990 beauty pageants